Symphony No. 6 in F Major may refer to:

 Symphony No. 6 (Beethoven), the Pastoral Symphony
 Symphony No. 6 op. 132 (published 1845), by Jan Kalivoda
 Symphony No. 6, K. 43 by Mozart

See also
 List of symphonies in F major